Buckingham House can refer to:

in England

Buckingham Palace, originally known as Buckingham House

in Canada
Buckingham House (fur trade post)

in the United States
Buckingham House (Milford, Connecticut), listed on the NRHP in New Haven County, Connecticut
William A. Buckingham House, Norwich, Connecticut, listed on the NRHP in Connecticut
John Buckingham House, Newton, Massachusetts, listed on the NRHP in Massachusetts
Buckingham-Petty House, Duncan Falls, Ohio, listed on the NRHP in Muskingum County, Ohio
Sherwood-Davidson and Buckingham Houses, Newark, Ohio, listed on the NRHP in Licking County, Ohio
Buckingham House (Sevierville, Tennessee), listed on the NRHP in Sevier County, Tennessee

See also
The Buckingham (disambiguation)